The fourth cabinet of Gheorghe Tătărăscu was the government of Romania from 17 November to 28 December 1937.

Ministers
The ministers of the cabinet were as follows:

President of the Council of Ministers:
Gheorghe Tătărăscu (17 November - 28 December 1937)
Minister of the Interior:
Richard Franasovici (17 November - 28 December 1937)
Minister of Foreign Affairs: 
Victor Antonescu (17 November - 28 December 1937)
Minister of Finance:
Mircea Cancicov (17 November - 28 December 1937)
Minister of Justice:
Vasile P. Sassu (17 November - 28 December 1937)
Minister of National Defence:
Gen. Constantin Ilasievici (17 November - 28 December 1937)
Minister of Air and Marine:
Radu Irimescu (17 November - 28 December 1937)
Minister of Agriculture and Property
Gheorghe Ionescu-Sisești (17 November - 28 December 1937)
Minister of Industry and Commerce:
Ion Bujoiu (17 November - 28 December 1937)
Minister of Public Works and Communications:
Ion Inculeț (17 November - 28 December 1937)
Minister of National Education:
Constantin Angelescu (17 November - 28 December 1937)
Minister of Religious Affairs and the Arts:
Victor Iamandi (17 November - 28 December 1937)
Minister of Labour:
Ion Nistor (17 November - 28 December 1937)
Minister of Health and Social Security
Ion Costinescu (17 November - 28 December 1937)
Minister of  Cooperation: 
Mihail Negură (17 November - 28 December 1937)

Ministers of State:
Valeriu Pop (17 November - 28 December 1937)
Ion Manolescu-Strunga (17 November - 28 December 1937)

References

Cabinets of Romania
Cabinets established in 1937
Cabinets disestablished in 1937
1937 establishments in Romania
1937 disestablishments in Romania